Buraq (also Romanized as Būraq) is a village in Dehshir Rural District, in the Central District of Taft County, Yazd Province, Iran. At the 2006 census, its population was 94, in 32 families.

References 

Populated places in Taft County